Gerald Davis may refer to:
Gerald Davis (Irish artist) (1938–2005), Irish artist
Gerald Davis (American artist) (born 1974), American artist
Gerald Davis (philatelist) (1916–2005), British architect, graphic designer, postal historian and philatelist
Gerald Davis (Canadian football) (born 1985), Canadian football offensive lineman
Gerald Davis (politician) (born 1936), former American state senator
Gerald Davis (photojournalist) (1940–1997), American photojournalist
Gerald F. Davis (born 1961), American sociologist

See also
Gerry Davis (disambiguation)
Gerald Davies (born 1945), Welsh rugby player
Gerald Davies (cricketer) (born 1949), Australian cricketer